"Snooping" can refer to:

Computer science
 Bus sniffing, also known as bus snooping
 IGMP snooping
 DHCP snooping
 and in general listening in to any kind of communication protocol (such as ARP, TCP and so on)

Statistics
 Data-snooping bias, a concept in statistics

See also 
 Snoop (disambiguation)
 Snoopy (disambiguation)
 Sniffing (disambiguation)